Charles  Parke (10 June 1791 – 1860) was an English landowner and Deputy Lieutenant of Dorset.

Life
He was the son of William Parke of the Thickets, Jamaica, and his wife Eleanor Baldwin Crosse. In 1810 he was HBM Commissioner to Mexico where he was tasked with purchasing bullion for the British Government. The family were slave-owners in Jamaica. The compensation money paid to them on emancipation was shared between Charles's brother William Parke (1784–1863) and his mother.

Parke's father died in 1813. In 1847 Charles Parke purchased the Henbury estate in Dorset, and resided there.

Family
In 1820 Parke married Letitia Alcock, daughter of Joseph Alcock of Roehampton. Letitia's brother was Thomas Alcock (MP). Their children included Charles Joseph Parke; and William Parke, at Eton College with him. Charles' great-niece Alice Katherine Parke, married Henry James Grasett, a Canadian militia and army officer who became the longest serving police chief in the history of the Toronto police force.

References

1791 births
1860 deaths
Deputy Lieutenants of Dorset